Rita Gabussi (1822 – after 1860) was an Italian soprano. Gabussi was born in Bologna and studied under Bertinotti in Milan. She sang in 1842 the main role of Nina pazza per amore by Pietro Antonio Coppola, performed at the Teatro del Re, Milan. Rita was married to the baritone opera singer Achille De Bassini (1819-1881), and retired to care for her family in Naples. Their son, Alberto De Bassini, was also an opera singer, first as a tenor, and later as a baritone.  Achille died, aged 62, at Cava de' Tirreni.

Sources
Dizionario biografico dei più celebri poeti ed artisti melodrammatici, tragici e comici, maestri, concertisti, coreografi, mimi, ballerini, scenografi, giornalisti, impresarii, ecc. che fiorirono in Italia dal 1800 al 1860, by Francesco Regli, Enrico Dalmazzo publisher, Turin (1860); page 216–217.

Italian operatic sopranos
1822 births
Italian singers
19th-century Italian women opera singers
Year of death missing